Frank J. Beck [born Frank J. Hengstebeck] (April 29, 1860 – February 8, 1941) was a right-handed starting pitcher and right fielder in Major League Baseball who played for the Pittsburgh Alleghenys (American Association) and Baltimore Monumentals (Union Association) during the  season.

In one season career, Beck posted a 0–5 record with a 6.62 ERA in five pitching appearances (four complete games), giving up 42 runs (17 unearned) on 50 hits and 10 walks while striking out 18 in 34.0 innings of work. He also played four games at right field. As a hitter, he went 6-for-32 for a .188 average, including two doubles and two runs scored.

According to Baseball Reference, he was born in 1858 and his death date and place are unknown; other sources say the man who died in Michigan is not the same individual as the ballplayer.

External links

Retrosheet

Major League Baseball pitchers
Major League Baseball outfielders
Baltimore Monumentals players
Pittsburgh Alleghenys players
19th-century baseball players
Baseball players from New York (state)
Sportspeople from Poughkeepsie, New York
1860 births
1941 deaths
Toledo Blue Stockings (minor league) players
Saginaw Greys players
Newburyport Clamdiggers players
Biddeford (minor league baseball) players
Brockton (minor league baseball) players
Lynn (minor league baseball) players
Ionia (minor league baseball) players